San Antonio is a village in the Toledo District of Belize. It is the largest Maya settlement in Belize, with a population of approximately 1,000 people, predominantly Mopan Maya. About 88% of the inhabitants are Catholic, with 8% belonging to other Christian denominations, and 4% being non-denominational. Along with 29 other mission parishes in the Toledo District, it is pastored by Jesuits from St. Peter Claver church in Punta Gorda.
 
The village was founded in 1883 by Maya fleeing persecution in Guatemala. This was a part of a larger migration which also included Q’eqchi’ from Alta Verpaz who settled further south in the Crique Sarco, Dolores, and later Sarstoon, Temash, and Moho River areas.  

Economic development came to San Antonio in the early 1950s with the founding of a credit union and cooperative that enabled villagers to market their own produce. Fr. William Ulrich, S.J., spearheaded this movement.

San Antonio features several attractions, including San Antonio Falls, a stone church built in 1950, and ecotourism guest houses.

References

External links

 San Antonio at Wikivoyage
Photo archive, early 20th century 

Populated places in Toledo District
Toledo West
Populated places established in 1883